Limbongan may refer to:

Limbongan, Brunei
Limbongan (state constituency), Malaysia